Elections to Chorley Borough Council were held on 2 May 2002.  The whole council was up for election with boundary changes since the last election in 2000 reducing the number of seats by one.  The council stayed under no overall control.

After the election the composition of the council was:

Election result

Ward results

Adlington and Anderton

Astley and Buckshaw

Brindle and Hoghton

Chisnall

Chorley East

Chorley North East

Chorley North West

Chorley South East

Chorley South West

Clayton-le-Woods and Whittle-le-Woods

Clayton-le-Woods North

Clayton-le-Woods West and Cuerden

Coppull

Eccleston and Mawdesley

Euxton North

Euxton South

Heath Charnock and Rivington

Lostock

Pennine

Wheelton and Withnell

References
2002 Chorley election result
 Ward results

2002 English local elections
2002
2000s in Lancashire